Zürich Binz is a railway station in the west of the Swiss city of Zürich, in the city's Alt-Wiedikon quarter. The station is on the Uetliberg line, which is operated by the Sihltal Zürich Uetliberg Bahn (SZU).

The station is served by the following passenger trains:

The station has a single track, with a single platform, although there is a dynamic passing loop between Binz and Friesenberg. Between Binz and Selnau, all Uetliberg line trains run non-stop, although they pass by Giesshübel station, on the SZU's Sihltal line.

References

External links 
 

Binz